Ridley Island is an island lying  north of False Round Point, King George Island, in the South Shetland Islands. This island was known to both American and British sealers as early as 1822, and the name Ridley is well established in international usage.

See also 
 List of Antarctic and sub-Antarctic islands
 

Islands of King George Island (South Shetland Islands)